Sidney Frederick Foster (24 May 1921 – 27 October 2007) was a Jamaican hurdler. He competed in the men's 110 metres hurdles at the 1948 Summer Olympics.

References

1921 births
2007 deaths
Athletes (track and field) at the 1948 Summer Olympics
Jamaican male hurdlers
Olympic athletes of Jamaica